Bezus is a surname. Notable people with the surname include:

 Dmitri Bezus (born 1989), Ukrainian kickboxer
 Roman Bezus (born 1990), Ukrainian footballer

See also
 Bezos (surname)